Thirteen Years' War may refer to:
the Thirteen Years' War (1454–1466) between the Prussian Confederation and Poland versus the Teutonic Order state
the Long Turkish War (1593–1606) between the Habsburg Monarchy and the Ottoman Empire
the Russo-Polish War (1654–1667) between Russia, the Cossacks and the Polish–Lithuanian Commonwealth

See also
 Fifteen Years War (disambiguation)